Articles discussing varieties of Christianity:

Christian denomination
List of Christian denominations
Christian movements
Christian-oriented new religious movements
Folk Christianity
Christology
Christian heresy
Christian schisms
National church

See also
History of Christianity
Christianity and Gnosticism